Ian "Inky" Tulloch  (born 21 September 1950) is a New Zealand racing-driver and a former politician in both local and national politics. He is most famous for his career in racing saloon cars as well as for being the last Mayor of Mataura before it became part of the Gore District Council. His father was Malcolm "Mac" Tulloch, a man who had been the Mayor of Mataura twice between 1959–1962 and between 1968–1970.

Biography

Racing career
Tulloch's extensive racing career has spanned four decades within which he participated in 119 races. During his career, Tulloch achieved 7 wins and 21 podium finishes. The notable competitions in which he raced were the Australian Production Car Championship, NZ Truth V8s Championship, Parker ENZED NZV8s Championship, and the NZ Production Car Championship. NZ & Australian super trucks.

In 2016 he crashed during a 1-hour endurance race in his Honda Integra clubmans saloon car and was taken to hospital in a critical condition.

Political career
Tulloch was elected Mayor of Mataura in 1983 and remained in office until the council ceased to exist in 1989. He then served as mayor of Gore District from 1989 until 1995. He was the first president of the United Future party.

In the 2006 New Year Honours, Tulloch was appointed a Companion of the Queen's Service Order for public services.

References

New Zealand racing drivers
Mayors of places in Southland, New Zealand
1950 births
Living people
Christian Coalition (New Zealand) politicians
Unsuccessful candidates in the 1996 New Zealand general election
United Future politicians
People from Mataura
New Zealand sportsperson-politicians
Companions of the Queen's Service Order
New Zealand justices of the peace
Mayors of Gore